Conor Horgan is an Irish film director, screenwriter and photographer.

Career
Horgan first trained as a photographer, before moving into directing TV commercials. He has directed over 70 commercials and has won Best Director and Best Photographer at the Irish Advertising Awards. His first short film, The Last Time, starring Linda Bassett, received a nationwide cinema release in Ireland and was the recipient of the UIP Director Award and Best Irish Short at the Cork Film Festival.

Horgan's first feature film is One Hundred Mornings, which premiered at the Slamdance Film Festival in 2010, winning the Special Mention Award. One Hundred Mornings also won the Vortex Sci-Fi & Fantasy Award at the Rhode Island International Film Festival and the Writers Guild of Ireland Best Feature Film Script Award.

In 2015, his feature documentary The Queen of Ireland debuted in Ireland, breaking the record for an opening weekend for an Irish documentary.

When 15 Horgan was a puppeteer on the Irish children's program Wanderly Wagon. He left school at 16 and spent several years travelling around Europe, working in Greece and Morocco as a geo-electrical surveyor for the University of Hamburg's Institut für Geophysik.

Filmography

Director 
 The Queen of Ireland (2015)
 They Terrify Me (2014)
 Deep End Dance (2010)
 One Hundred Mornings (2009)
 The Last Time (2002)

Screenwriter 
 How To Be Happy (2013)
 Keys to the City (2012)
 One Hundred Mornings (2009)
 The Last Time (2002)

References

External links
 
 

Date of birth missing (living people)
Expatriate actors in France
Irish expatriates in France
Irish film directors
Irish screenwriters
Television commercial directors
Living people
Year of birth missing (living people)